Champagne Louis Nicaise is a Champagne house  located in Hautvillers, the Premier Cru  village made famous by Dom Perignon.
Varietals grown on the estate include Chardonnay, Pinot Noir, and Pinot Meunier, and only 6,000 cases per year are produced. 
The current owner-winemakers are married couple Laure Nicaise-Préaux & Clement Préaux. Laure Nicaise-Préaux is the fourth generation of her family to make Champagne in the estate. Clement Préaux had apprenticed under Anselme Selosse. Changes implemented by the couple include  lowering the dosage and earning certification in sustainability.

References

Champagne producers
French brands